Arbër Çyrbja (born 18 September 1993) is an Albanian professional footballer who plays as a midfielder for Albanian club KF Teuta Durrës.

Club career
Born in Shijak, Çyrbja started his career with Teuta Durrës, where in 2011 he joined the under-19 side and scored 7 goals in 19 games as a right midfielder during the 2011–12 season. During the second half of the season he was invited to train with the senior side and was included in the senior team's Albanian Cup side.

He joined Albanian Second Division side Erzeni in September 2014 where he played 9 games and scored twice before moving back to the Albanian Superliga with Elbasani in January 2015.

Çyrbja returned to his boyhood club Teuta Durrës in July 2015 after only half season at Elbasani. He served as captain in the 2017–18 season, in which he played 34 league games and scored 7 goals, a new personal best.

On 23 June 2018, Kukësi announced to have signed Çyrbja ona two-year deal for a reported fee of €50,000. He deal also included an additional €50,000 to Teuta Durrës if Kukësi manages to sell the player to a foreign club.

International career
A former Albania youth international, Çyrbja has represented under-18 side, making two appearances.

Career statistics

References

External links

1993 births
Living people
People from Shijak
Albanian footballers
Association football midfielders
KF Teuta Durrës players
KF Erzeni players
KF Elbasani players
FK Kukësi players
Kategoria Superiore players
Kategoria e Dytë players